Xyniada or Xynias (Ξυνιάς) is a village and a former municipality in Phthiotis, Greece. Since the 2011 local government reform it is part of the municipality Domokos, of which it is a municipal unit. In the 2011 census, the municipal unit was recorded as having 3,549 inhabitants, and the village of Xyniada itself 459. The municipal unit has an area of 206.820 km2. The village takes its name from Lake Xyniada, which covered the local plain until it was drained in 1936–42. The ruins of the ancient city of Xyniae (medieval Ezeros) are nearby.

External links
 Municipality of Xyniada

References

Populated places in Phthiotis